Mary Fragedakis (born April 22, 1971) is a Canadian politician who served as the Toronto city councillor for Ward 29 Toronto—Danforth from 2010 to 2018. She was also the Ontario Liberal Party candidate for Toronto—Danforth in the 2022 provincial election. Fragedakis has been the executive director of the GreekTown on the Danforth Business Improvement Area (BIA) since April 2019.

Early life and education

Fragedakis is the child of Greek immigrants, and spent her childhood in the Danforth community. She attended Wilkinson Public School, Earl Grey Senior Public School and Riverdale Collegiate Institute, before graduating from the University of Toronto in 1996 with a Master of Arts (MA) in political science. Prior to her election, Fragedakis was involved for nine years with Open Dialogue, a conference and seminar organizing company and served as one of the founders of the Broadview Community Youth Group.

Political career

First term 
Fragedakis was encouraged to run by former councillor and then-federal New Democratic Party (NDP) leader Jack Layton, and contested the 2010 municipal election in Ward 29 to succeed retiring councillor Case Ootes. She defeated Ootes' preferred candidate, Jane Pitfield, 41.8 per cent to 28 per cent.

Second term 
Fragedakis was re-elected as councillor for Ward 29 in the 2014 Toronto election with a significant plurality of over 60 per cent of the popular vote.

Toronto Transit Commission Board 
The Toronto City Council appointed Fragedakis to the Toronto Transit Commission (TTC) Board in late 2016. On the board she was a strong advocate for improving public transit. In 2017, she moved a motion to find the $1.2 million for the subway reliability program, which TTC CEO Andy Byford told council would help cut down on track-related subway delays by up to 30 per cent.“I think we owe it to subway users. I know they’ve put up with a lot of subway closures, they’ve put up with no air conditioning on subway cars, they’ve put up with trains too full to get on in the morning and other delays,” Mary Fragedakis. During the city's 2018 budget process, she called for more money for the TTC to address overcrowding.

Two-hour transfer policy 
Along with Mayor John Tory and TTC Chair Josh Colle, Fragedakis advocated for the TTC's two-hour transfer policy.

2018 election 
In the 2018 municipal election, the Ward 29 was combined with the other Toronto—Danforth, Ward 30, forming the new Ward 14. Fragedakis ran again as councillor for the newly constituted ward, however, lost to Paula Fletcher who was the incumbent councillor for former Ward 30.

After council 
In April 2019 Fragedakis became the Executive Director of the GreekTown on the Danforth BIA.

2022 Ontario election 
Fragedakis announced in January 2022 she would seek the Ontario Liberal Party nomination for Toronto—Danforth in the upcoming 2022 provincial election. She won the nomination on March 17. In the election, she lost coming in second to NDP incumbent Peter Tabuns.

Electoral history

Official results.

References

External links

1971 births
Canadian people of Greek descent
Women municipal councillors in Canada
Living people
Toronto city councillors
University of Toronto alumni
Women in Ontario politics
21st-century Canadian politicians
21st-century Canadian women politicians